The Smoove Jones Show tour is the fourth concert tour by American recording artist Mýa. It was launched in support of her eighth studio project, Smoove Jones (2016), and consisted of three legs. The first leg of the tour began on February 27, 2016 and concluded on June 25, 2016.

Background
Mýa said about her Smoove Jones Show tour, "My ass stays on the road! That’s how I fund all of my projects. It might not be on the level of a Madonna. But I'm always somewhere on the globe [laughs]. I prefer to be on the road with other females.  India Arie, Erykah Badu, [and] Marsha Ambrosius are so dope to me."

Critical reception
Writing on behalf of Live Nation TV, Layla Halabian gave Mýa's performance a rave review and said, "Mýa wasted no time indulging the audience with hits like "Ghetto Supastar" and "My Love Is Like...Wo"." Commenting on Mýa's interaction with her audience, she wrote, "The relationship between Mýa and her crowd was symbiotic, with each round of applause creating the type of comfortable and easy dynamic that comes from feeling like you've known someone for more than half their life." Halabian concluded her review of the performance, "Seeing Mýa live is like having a pep talk with a best friend who pushes you towards unbearable clarity, through painful moments of realization that are rarely reached on your own."

During her stint on Australia's RNB Friday Live Tour, Mýa's set received mixed to positive feedback from audiences. Staff writer Jessica Leo-Kelton of The Advertiser wrote, "Mýa proved a surprise in a small package, flanked by back-up dancers and showing some vocal gymnastics, the petite performer commanded the attention of the audience running through hits including "Ghetto Supastar" and "Case of the Ex"."
The Musics Natasha Pinto concluded, "Adorned in a glittery silver ensemble, Mya begins with "Case Of The Ex (Whatcha Gonna Do)". She possesses the dreamiest falsetto and commands attention with every note and step she takes. After a jaw-dropping dance routine and another glam outfit change, Mýa performs "Lady Marmalade" with absolute ease and sultry sass, accompanied by two back-up dancers who don't miss a beat."

On her solo outings with R&B groups Blackstreet and 112, Mýa continued to receive standing ovations for her performances. Writing for the AU Review, Chris Singh said, "Mýa’s showmanship has certainly not aged, neither have those dulcet notes that stole the show on "Lady Marmalade", or the attitude that made "It's All About Me" and "Case of the Ex" such chart-dominating singles... though she was basically the opener in a triple-threat here, Mýa was a tough act to follow. She also proved to be the most versatile on the night".

Setlist
This set list is representative of the concert on June 3, 2016. It does not represent all concerts for the duration of the tour.

Shows

Notes

References

2016 concert tours